The Next Revolution is a television program that debuted on the Fox News Channel on June 4, 2017. The hour-long weekly program is hosted by Steve Hilton, who served as a political adviser to former British prime minister David Cameron. The program focuses on providing opinion commentary about the right-wing populist movement.

The program airs at 9 p.m. ET/6 p.m. PT on Sunday nights live from the Fox News West Coast bureau in Los Angeles.

According to the Fox News announcement of the program's debut, The Next Revolution will present news about politics within America and around the world. Hilton also voices against the radical left and their goal to destroy America through globalism.

References

Fox News original programming
2017 American television series debuts
2010s American television news shows
2020s American television news shows
2020s American television series
Liberalism in the United States